Tachyta parvicornis is a species of ground beetle in the family Carabidae. It is found in North America.

References

Trechinae
Articles created by Qbugbot
Beetles described in 1922